Lalnun Mawia is an Indian professional footballer who plays as a midfielder for Chennai City in the I-League.

Career
Born in Mizoram, Mawia has represented his side as a youth player in the Mir Iqbal Hussain Trophy and then at senior level in the T Ao football tournament.

Chennai City
On 8 January 2017, Mawia made his professional debut for Chennai City in the I-League against Minerva Punjab.

Career statistics

References

Year of birth missing (living people)
Living people
People from Mizoram
Indian footballers
Chennai City FC players
Association football midfielders
Footballers from Mizoram
I-League players